is an East Japan Railway Company (JR East) railway station located in the town of Shizukuishi, Iwate Prefecture, Japan.

Lines
Akabuchi Station is served by the Tazawako Line, and is located 22.0 rail kilometers from the terminus of the line at Morioka Station.

Station layout
Akabuchi Station has a single island platform. There is no station building, but only a weather shelter on the platform itself. The station is unattended.

Platforms

History
Akabuchi Station opened on September 10, 1964, as the terminal station of the now defunct Hashiba Line. It became a station on the Tazawako Line from October 20, 1966. The station was absorbed into the JR East network upon the privatization of the JNR on April 1, 1987.

Surrounding area
  National Route 46
Kunimi Onsen

See also
 List of Railway Stations in Japan

References

External links

  

Railway stations in Iwate Prefecture
Shizukuishi, Iwate
Tazawako Line
Railway stations in Japan opened in 1964
Stations of East Japan Railway Company